Hunted Forever is browser based platform game released in 2008. It was created by Canadian developer Evan Miller who was a college student at the time. The game was developed in 6 weeks in  Adobe Flash. Miller first published the game on the social gaming website King in October 2008, from where it spread to other online gaming websites.

The game was listed in the 8th spot in Time's "Top 10 Video Games of 2008" list, where it was praised for its style and innovation. As of late 2008, the game has been played some 2 million times.

References

2008 video games
Browser games
Flash games
Platform games
Single-player online games
Video games developed in Canada